The Richard M. Skinner House is a historic house located at 627 East Peru Street in Princeton, Illinois. Built in 1878, the house was designed by Princeton architect Joseph Plummer Bryant. Bryant's design was largely a Second Empire work but also included Italianate elements. The house has a mansard roof, a characteristic Second Empire feature, with a projecting central pavilion at the front entrance; seven dormers project from the roof. The roof's cornice is bracketed, displaying the design's Italianate influence. A veranda along the front of the house features detailed moldings along the edge of the roof and a balustrade along the bottom.

The house was added to the National Register of Historic Places on February 10, 1983.

References

Houses on the National Register of Historic Places in Illinois
Italianate architecture in Illinois
Second Empire architecture in Illinois
Houses completed in 1878
National Register of Historic Places in Bureau County, Illinois